Dominique Da Silva (born 30 June 1968) is a French politician of La République En Marche! (LREM) who has been serving as a member of the French National Assembly since the 2017 elections, representing the Val-d'Oise's 7th constituency.

Political career
In parliament, Da Silva serves as a member of the Committee on Social Affairs. In this capacity, he is the parliament's rapporteur on health insurance.

Political positions
In July 2019, Da Silva voted in favor of the French ratification of the European Union’s Comprehensive Economic and Trade Agreement (CETA) with Canada.

See also
 2017 French legislative election

References

1968 births
Living people
People from L'Isle-Adam, Val-d'Oise
French people of Portuguese descent
La République En Marche! politicians
Deputies of the 15th National Assembly of the French Fifth Republic
Politicians from Île-de-France
Members of Parliament for Val-d'Oise